
Year 394 (CCCXCIV) was a common year starting on Sunday (link will display the full calendar) of the Julian calendar. At the time, it was known in Western Europe as the Year of the Consulship of Flavianus without colleague (or, less frequently, year 1147 Ab urbe condita). The denomination 394 for this year has been used since the early medieval period, when the Anno Domini calendar era became the prevalent method in Europe for naming years.

Events 
 By place 
 Roman Empire 
 September 6 – Battle of the Frigidus: Emperor Theodosius I defeats and kills the usurper Eugenius. The forces of Theodosius are bolstered by numerous auxiliaries, including 20,000 Visigoth federates under Alaric. The Frankish general Arbogast (magister militum) escapes into the Alps and commits suicide.
 Late Roman army: The Notitia Dignitatum shows the development of forces in the Roman Empire. By now 200,000 soldiers guard the borders, and a reserve force of 50,000 is available for deployment. Many non-Roman soldiers are from Germanic tribes: Alamanni, Franks, Goths, Saxons and Vandals.
 Winter – The Huns cross the frozen Danube and destroy the villages built by the Goths. Theodosius I, six hundred miles away in Italy, sends no reinforcements to defend the northern frontier. 
 In Rome, the sacred fire stops burning (see Vesta and Vestal Virgins).

 Egypt 
 The last known hieroglyphic inscription, known as the Graffito of Esmet-Akhom, is written in Philae, Egypt.

 China 
 The last ruler of Former Qin, Fu Chong, is killed in battle against an army of Western Qin, bringing Former Qin to an end.

 By topic 
 Religion 
 Epiphanius of Salamis attacks Origen's followers and urges John II, Bishop of Jerusalem, to condemn his writings.
 The Council of Bagaï in Africa brings 310 Donatist bishops together.

Births 
 Gunabhadra, Indian Buddhist scholar-monk (d. 468)
 Jangsu, Korean king of Goguryeo (d. 491)

Deaths 
 September 6 – Eugenius, Roman usurper
 September 8 – Arbogast, Frankish general
 Fu Chong, emperor of the Chinese Di state Former Qin
 Fu Deng, emperor of the Di state Former Qin (b. 343)
 Murong Yong, emperor of the Xianbei state Western Yan
 Virius Nicomachus Flavianus, Roman historian and politician (b. 334)
 Yao Chang, emperor of the Qiang state Later Qin (b. 331)

References